Berks, Bucks & Oxon Premier is a division at level 8 of the English rugby union system featuring teams from Berkshire, Buckinghamshire and Oxfordshire. Promoted teams usually move up to Southern Counties North while relegated teams used to drop to the Berks/Bucks & Oxon Championship, although this division has been discontinued as of the end of the 2018–19 season.  Each year three teams (one each from the Berkshire, Buckinghamshire and Oxfordshire unions) are picked to take part in the RFU Senior Vase (a level 8 national cup competition).

When the league was introduced in 1987 it was known as Bucks/Oxon 1 and was set up originally for teams from Buckinghamshire and Oxfordshire.  It was expanded to include teams from Berkshire (who had been playing teams from Dorset and Wiltshire) from the 2000–01 season onwards.

Teams 2021–22

In February 2022 Drifters RFC withdrew from the league with their fixtures liquidated meaning it will be completed with eleven teams.

2020–21
Due to the COVID-19 pandemic, the 2020–21 season was cancelled.

Teams 2019–20

Teams 2018–19

Teams 2017–18

Teams 2016–17
Abingdon
Alcester
Chesham
Crowthorne
Didcot (promoted from Berks/Bucks & Oxon Championship)
Drifters (relegated from Southern Counties North)
Hungerford
Phoenix (promoted from Berks/Bucks & Oxon Championship)
Risborough
Slough
Swindon College Old Boys (relegated from Southern Counties North)
Tadley

2015–16
The 2015–16 Berks/Bucks & Oxon Premier consisted of twelve teams; five from Oxfordshire, four from Berkshire and three from Buckinghamshire. The season started on 12 September 2015 and the last league matches were played on 23 April 2016.

Participating teams and location
Seven of the twelve teams participated in last season's competition. The 2014–15 champions Reading Abbey were promoted to the Southern Counties North along with runner-up, Swindon College Old Boys, while Phoenix were relegated to the Berks/Bucks & Oxon Championship.

2014–15

Participating teams
Abingdon (promoted from Berks/Bucks & Oxon Championship)
Aylesbury Athletic
Chesham
Chipping Norton
Gosford All Blacks
Littlemore
Phoenix
Reading Abbey (relegated from Southern Counties North)
Slough
Swindon College Old Boys (relegated from Southern Counties North)
Wheatley (promoted from Berks/Bucks & Oxon Championship)

2013–14

Participating teams
Aylesbury Athletic
Bicester
Chesham (promoted from Berks/Bucks & Oxon Championship)
Chipping Norton
Farnham Royal (promoted from Berks/Bucks & Oxon Championship)
Gosford All Blacks
Hungerford
Littlemore
Phoenix
Slough (relegated from Southern Counties North)
Tadley (relegated from Southern Counties North)

2012–13

Participating teams
Aylesbury Athletic
Bicester
Chipping Norton
Gosford All Blacks
Harwell
Hungerford
Littlemore
Phoenix
Risborough
Stow-on-the-Wold
Swindon College Old Boys

2011–12

Participating teams
 Bicester
 Chipping Norton
 Drifters
 Gosford All Blacks
 Hungerford
 Littlemore
 Phoenix
 Stow-on-the-Wold and District
 Swindon College Old Boys
 Thatcham

Original teams
When league rugby began in 1987 this division (known as Bucks/Oxon 1) contained the following teams from Buckinghamshire and Oxfordshire:

Abingdon
Beaconsfield
Bicester
Buckingham
Chiltern
Chinnor
Didcot
Grove
Littlemore
Pennanians
Slough
Witney

Berks/Bucks & Oxon Premier honours

Bucks/Oxon 1 (1987–1993)

Originally known as Bucks/Oxon 1, it was a level 8 league for clubs based in Buckinghamshire and Oxfordshire.  Promotion was to Southern Counties and relegation to Bucks/Oxon 2.

Bucks/Oxon 1 (1993–1996)

The creation of National League 5 South for the 1993–94 season meant that Bucks/Oxon 1 dropped to become a tier 9 league.  Promotion continued to Southern Counties and relegation to Bucks/Oxon 2.

Bucks/Oxon (1996–1997)

The cancellation of National League 5 South at the end of the 1995–96 season saw Bucks/Oxon 1 renamed as Bucks/Oxon and once more was a tier 8 league.  Further restructuring meant that promotion was now to Southern Counties North and relegation was to Bucks/Oxon 2.

Bucks/Oxon 1 (1997–1999)

Bucks/Oxon would revert to its former name of Bucks/Oxon 1 for the 1997–98 season, remaining a tier 8 league.  Promotion continued to Southern Counties North and relegation to Bucks/Oxon 2

Bucks/Oxon (1999–2000)

Once again Bucks/Oxon 1 became a single league known as Bucks/Oxon, remaining at tier 8.  Promotion continued to Southern Counties North, while relegation would be to the new Berks/Bucks & Oxon 2.

Berks/Bucks & Oxon 1 (2000–2004)

Restructuring ahead of the 2000–01 season would see Berkshire based clubs join the Bucks & Oxon leagues.  This meant that Bucks/Oxon 1 would be renamed Berks/Bucks & Oxon 1, remaining a tier 8 league.  Promotion would continue to Southern Counties North, while relegation was to Berks/Bucks & Oxon 2.

Berks/Bucks & Oxon (2004–2009)

Ahead of the 2004–05 season Berks/Bucks & Oxon 1 was renamed to Berks/Bucks & Oxon Premier, remaining a tier 8 league.  Promotion continued to Southern Counties North and relegation was now to Berks/Bucks & Oxon 1 (formerly Berks/Bucks & Oxon 2).

Berks/Bucks & Oxon Premier (2009–present)

Despite widespread restructuring by the RFU at the end of the 2008–09 season, Berks/Bucks & Oxon Premier remained a tier 8 league, with promotion continuing to Southern Counties South and relegation to the newly introduced Berks/Bucks & Oxon Championship (last known as Berks/Bucks & Oxon 2).

Number of league titles

Amersham & Chiltern (2)
Bicester (2)
Chipping Norton (2)
Gosford All Blacks (2)
Newbury Stags (2)
Slough (2)
Alchester (1)
Bletchley (1)
Chesham (1)
Chinnor (1)
Cholsey (1)
Crowthorne (1)
Drifters (1)
Grove (1)
Henley Wanderers (1)
Olney (1)
Oxford (1)
Oxford Marathon (1)  
Oxford Old Boys (1)
Phoenix (1)
Reading Abbey (1)
Stow-on-the-Wold (1)
Swindon (1)
Swindon College Old Boys (1)
Tadley (1)
Wallingford (1)
Witney (1)

Notes

See also
 South West Division RFU
 Berkshire RFU
 Buckinghamshire RFU
 Oxfordshire RFU
 English rugby union system
 Rugby union in England

References

External links
 South West Divisions on the RFU website
 Berks/Bucks & Oxon Premier 1 North on the RFU website
 Berks/Bucks & Oxon Premier 2 North on the RFU website

8
Rugby union in Oxfordshire
Rugby union in Buckinghamshire
Rugby union in Berkshire